James Byars Allen Jr. (born June 15, 1971) is an American college basketball coach.  He was the head men's basketball coach at the United States Military Academy (Army) from 2016 to 2023.  Allen was the head men's basketball coach at Averett University in Danville, Virginia from 2004 to 2010.

Playing career
Born in El Paso, Texas, Allen lived in West Point, New York for much of his childhood; his father was a 1967 graduate of the U.S. Military Academy who served in the U.S. Army for 20 years. In eleventh grade, he moved to Roanoke, Virginia, where he graduated from Northside High School in 1989. At Emory and Henry College, Allen was a four-year starter for the Emory and Henry Wasps, playing in 117 games and ranked second all-time in assists with 455, and fourth all-time in steals with 162. In 2008, he was inducted in the Emory and Henry Athletic Hall of Fame. Allen graduated from Emory and Henry in 1993 with a bachelor's degree in accounting.

Coaching career
After graduation, Allen got his coaching start at his alma mater, where he stayed for three seasons before joining Don DeVoe's staff at Navy, where he was part of two Patriot League title squads in 1997 and 1998.

From 2002 to 2004, Allen was an assistant at Wofford, before landing his first head coaching job at Averett, where he took over a 0–25 team to lead it to four NCAA Tournament appearances and 97–70 overall record in six seasons, as well as being named a USA South Athletic Conference Coach of the year in 2005, 2007, and 2008.

In 2010, Allen joined Zach Spiker's staff at Army, and was elevated to the head coaching position when Spiker left for Drexel on March 30, 2016.

Head coaching record

References

1971 births
Living people
American men's basketball coaches
Army Black Knights men's basketball coaches
Averett Cougars men's basketball coaches
Emory and Henry Wasps men's basketball coaches
Emory and Henry Wasps men's basketball players
Navy Midshipmen men's basketball coaches
Wofford Terriers men's basketball coaches
American men's basketball players
Sportspeople from Roanoke, Virginia
People from West Point, New York
Sportspeople from El Paso, Texas
Basketball coaches from New York (state)
Basketball coaches from Texas
Basketball coaches from Virginia
Basketball players from El Paso, Texas